Left-interventionism is that part of the progressive interventionist movement of various matrices (Mazzinian, social-reformist, democratic socialist, dissident socialist, revolutionary) who saw in the Great War the historical opportunity, both for the completion of unity and both for the palingenesis of the Italian political system and the organization of the economic, legal and social system, therefore a profound change.

References 

Progressivism in Italy